Hefekranz or Hefezopf (literally "yeast wreath" and "yeast braid") are sweet breads from Switzerland, Germany, Austria and South Tyrol.

The dough is made from sugar, flour, butter, eggs and yeast (sometimes with raisins or almonds).

Typically both Hefezopf and Hefekranz consist of three braided dough-pieces. While the Hefezopf ("Zopf" meaning braid) is a loaf consisting only of a braid, the Hefekranz' braid is bent into a wreath ("Kranz" meaning wreath).

Two similar kinds of bread called vetekrans and vetelängd (literally "wheat wreath" and "wheat length" respectively) are common in Sweden. Vetelängd is shapewise very similar to the Hefezopf, whereas the Vetekrans' two ends are joined, shaping the bread into an O-shape, prior to baking.

See also
 Challah
 Zopf – unsweetened Swiss variant
 Vánočka – Slavic variant
 List of sweet breads

External links
King Arthur Flour Recipe: Hefekranz 

German breads
Swiss breads
Austrian breads
Sweet breads
Braided egg breads